Vasil Tupurkovski (born 8 April 1951) is a Macedonian academic, politician and the former president of the Olympic Committee of North Macedonia.

Tupurkovski was born in Skopje, PR Macedonia, FPR Yugoslavia. After graduation, he worked as a professor of International law at the University of Skopje. He was the founder of the centrist political party Democratic Alternative (Demokratska alternativa) in March 1998. Between 1999 and 2000 he served as Deputy Prime Minister in the government under Ljubčo Georgievski. In April 2009, he was sentenced to three years in jail on charges of embezzlement and misuse of public funds. This decision was reversed on 9 December 2009 by the Appellate Court.

Tupurkovski was featured in the BBC documentary The Death of Yugoslavia.

References

1951 births
Living people
Politicians from Skopje
Democratic Alternative (North Macedonia) politicians
Deputy Prime Ministers of North Macedonia
Government ministers of North Macedonia
Ss. Cyril and Methodius University of Skopje alumni
Academic staff of the Ss. Cyril and Methodius University of Skopje